Lukas Reichel (born May 17, 2002) is a German professional ice hockey left winger currently playing for the  Chicago Blackhawks of the National Hockey League (NHL).

Playing career
Reichel played as a youth in the German Development League (DNL) with Starbulls Rosenheim and within the Eisbären Berlin organization. He made his Deutsche Eishockey Liga (DEL) debut with Eisbären Berlin during the 2019–20 season.  He was drafted by the Chicago Blackhawks in the first round of the 2020 NHL Entry Draft with the 17th overall pick.

On 9 June 2021, Reichel was signed to a three-year, entry-level contract with the Chicago Blackhawks.

Personal life
He is the son of Czech-German hockey player Martin Reichel, and the nephew of former NHLer and Olympic gold medal winner Robert Reichel.

Career statistics

Regular season and playoffs

International

Awards and honors

References

External links

2002 births
Living people
German ice hockey left wingers
Eisbären Berlin players
Chicago Blackhawks draft picks
Chicago Blackhawks players
German people of Czech descent
National Hockey League first-round draft picks
Rockford IceHogs (AHL) players
Sportspeople from Nuremberg
German expatriate ice hockey people
German expatriate sportspeople in the United States
Expatriate ice hockey players in the United States